Rallicula is a genus of bird in the family Sarothruridae. It contains four species endemic to the island of  New Guinea.
 Chestnut forest rail, Rallicula rubra
 White-striped forest rail, Rallicula leucospila
 Forbes's forest rail, Rallicula forbesi
 Mayr's forest rail, Rallicula mayri

References

 
Bird genera